Brian Stewart Parkyn (28 April 1923 – 22 March 2006) was a British Labour Party politician.

Early years
Parkyn was educated at King Edward VI Grammar School,  Chelmsford, and at technical colleges. Like his father, Leslie Parkyn, in the First World War, he was a conscientious objector in the Second World War.

Career
He joined his uncle in the firm of Scott Bader, becoming a director in 1953. He was a council member of the British Plastics Federation.

Parkyn was elected Member of Parliament for Bedford in 1966, having first contested the seat in 1964, and ousting Christopher Soames, son-in-law of Sir Winston Churchill by a narrow majority. He notably served on the House of Commons Select Committee on Science and Technology. In 1970 he lost his seat to the Conservative Trevor Skeet; he attempted unsuccessfully to regain the seat in October 1974.

References 
Times Guide to the House of Commons October 1974

External links 
 

1923 births
2006 deaths
British conscientious objectors
Labour Party (UK) MPs for English constituencies
UK MPs 1966–1970
People educated at King Edward VI Grammar School, Chelmsford